Zuidbuurt is a village in the Dutch province of South Holland. It is a part of the municipality of Zoeterwoude, and lies about 6 km north of Zoetermeer.

In 2001 Zuidbuurt had 325 inhabitants. The built-up area of the town was 0.050 km², and contained 130 residences.
The statistical area "Zuidbuurt", which also can include the peripheral parts of the village, as well as the surrounding countryside, has a population of around 410.

References

Populated places in South Holland
Zoeterwoude